Nowy Tomyśl  is a town in western Poland, in Greater Poland Voivodeship. It is the capital of Nowy Tomyśl County. The population is 15,627 (2004).

The town has a long tradition of wickerwork. The town also has a Museum of Basketry and Hop Growing, which is one of the branches of the National Museum of Agriculture in Szreniawa. Next to the museum is a small zoo.

Since 2012, Nowy Tomyśl has been the site of one of the tallest wind turbines in the world.

External links
 

Cities and towns in Greater Poland Voivodeship
Nowy Tomyśl County
Poznań Voivodeship (1921–1939)